Ariely Westphal (born May 12, 1994) is a Brazilian fashion model.

Career
Westphal was discovered by a modeling agency in her hometown of Belo Horizonte and debuted as a semi-exclusive for Chloé in the Fall Winter 2015 season, including runway and campaigns, and Brandon Maxwell.

On the runway she modeled for brands such as Chanel, 3.1 Phillip Lim, Kenzo x H&M, Tom Ford, Sonia Rykiel, Belstaff, Saks Fifth Avenue, Stella McCartney, and Vivienne Westwood.

Westphal has been on the cover of Vogue Brasil, Elle Brasil, and Harper's Bazaar Netherlands among others. She can be seen alongside models like Adwoa Aboah, Maria Borges, and Issa Lish in Sephora's Let's Beauty Together campaign.

Westphal has been frequently deemed a future supermodel and is called "the next Gisele Bündchen" by Brazilian media and Vogue.

She is known for her short haircut.

Personal life
She is of Italian Brazilian, German Brazilian, and Afro-Brazilian descent. Before modeling, she was studying law in Minas Gerais, her home state.

References

External links
Ari Westphal on Models.com
Ari Westphal at the Fashion Model Directory

1994 births
Living people
People from Belo Horizonte
People from Vitória, Espírito Santo
Brazilian people of German descent
Brazilian people of Italian descent
Brazilian female models
Brazilian models of German descent
Afro-Brazilian female models
Afro-Brazilian women
Brazilian expatriates in the United Kingdom